United States v. United Mine Workers of America, 330 U.S. 258 (1947), was a case in which the United States Supreme Court examined whether a trial court acted appropriately when it issued a restraining order to prevent a labor strike organized by coal miners. In an opinion written by Chief Justice Fred M. Vinson, the Court held that a restraining order and preliminary injunction prohibiting a strike did not violate the Clayton Antitrust Act or the Norris–La Guardia Act, that the trial court was authorized to punish the violation of its orders as criminal contempt, and that fines imposed by the trial court were warranted in the situation.

See also
 List of United States Supreme Court cases, volume 330

References

External links
 
 

United States Supreme Court cases
United Mine Workers of America litigation
1947 in United States case law
United States Supreme Court cases of the Vinson Court
United States labor case law